The 2023 San Francisco Giants season will be the 141st season for the franchise in Major League Baseball, their 66th year in San Francisco, and their 24th at Oracle Park. This will be the fourth season under manager Gabe Kapler.

Offseason

Rule changes 
Pursuant to the CBA, new rule changes will be in place for the 2023 season:

 institution of a pitch clock between pitches;
 limits on pickoff attempts per plate appearance;
 limits on defensive shifts requiring two infielders to be on either side of second and be within the boundary of the infield; and
 larger bases (increased to 18-inch squares);

Transactions
 November 6, 2022 − LHP Carlos Rodón exercised his 2023 opt-out clause, allowing him to become a free agent.
 November 16, 2022 − The Giants declined to exercise their option on 3B Evan Longoria, allowing him to become a free agent.
 December 7, 2022 − The Giants signed OF Mitch Haniger to a three-year contract. Haniger can opt out of the contract after 2024 season.
 December 13, 2022 − The Giants signed RHP Ross Stripling to a two-year contract. Stripling can opt out of the contract after one year.
 December 16, 2022 − The Giants signed LHP Sean Manaea to a two-year contract. Manaea can opt out of the contract after one year.
 December 28, 2022 − The Giants signed LHP Taylor Rogers to a three-year contract.
 January 6, 2023 − The Giants signed OF Michael Conforto to a two-year contract. Conforto can opt out of the contract after one year.
 January 9, 2023 − The Giants signed RHP Luke Jackson to a two-year contract with a club option for 2025 season.
 January 9, 2023 − The Giants traded RHP Yunior Marte to Philadelphia Phillies for LHP Erik Miller.
 January 13, 2023 − The Giants avoided arbitration with RHP Logan Webb, RHP John Brebbia, RHP Jakob Junis, OF Austin Slater, INF J. D. Davis, OF LaMonte Wade Jr., RHP Tyler Rogers, and INF Thairo Estrada agreeing to one-year deals.

Regular season

Game log

|- style="background: 
| 1 || March 30 || @ Yankees || – || || || — || Yankee Stadium || || –
|- style="background: 
| 2 || April 1 || @ Yankees || – || || || — || Yankee Stadium || || –
|- style="background: 
| 3 || April 2 || @ Yankees || – || || || — || Yankee Stadium || || –
|- style="background: 
| 4 || April 3 || @ White Sox || – || || || — || Guaranteed Rate Field || || –
|- style="background: 
| 5 || April 5 || @ White Sox || – || || || — || Guaranteed Rate Field || || –
|- style="background: 
| 6 || April 6 || @ White Sox || – || || || — || Guaranteed Rate Field || || –
|- style="background: 
| 7 || April 7 || Royals || – || || || — || Oracle Park || || –
|- style="background: 
| 8 || April 8 || Royals || – || || || — || Oracle Park || || –
|- style="background: 
| 9 || April 9 || Royals || – || || || — || Oracle Park || || –
|- style="background: 
| 10 || April 10 || Dodgers || – || || || — || Oracle Park || || –
|- style="background: 
| 11 || April 11 || Dodgers || – || || || — || Oracle Park || || –
|- style="background: 
| 12 || April 12 || Dodgers || – || || || — || Oracle Park || || –
|- style="background: 
| 13 || April 14 || @ Tigers || – || || || — || Comerica Park || || –
|- style="background: 
| 14 || April 15 || @ Tigers || – || || || — || Comerica Park || || –
|- style="background: 
| 15 || April 16 || @ Tigers || – || || || — || Comerica Park || || –
|- style="background: 
| 16 || April 17 || @ Marlins || – || || || — || LoanDepot Park || || –
|- style="background: 
| 17 || April 18 || @ Marlins || – || || || — || LoanDepot Park || || –
|- style="background: 
| 18 || April 19 || @ Marlins || – || || || — || LoanDepot Park || || –
|- style="background: 
| 19 || April 20 || Mets || – || || || — || Oracle Park || || –
|- style="background: 
| 20 || April 21 || Mets || – || || || — || Oracle Park || || –
|- style="background: 
| 21 || April 22 || Mets || – || || || — || Oracle Park || || –
|- style="background: 
| 22 || April 23 || Mets || – || || || — || Oracle Park || || –
|- style="background: 
| 23 || April 24 || Cardinals || – || || || — || Oracle Park || || –
|- style="background: 
| 24 || April 25 || Cardinals || – || || || — || Oracle Park || || –
|- style="background: 
| 25 || April 26 || Cardinals || – || || || — || Oracle Park || || –
|- style="background: 
| 26 || April 27 || Cardinals || – || || || — || Oracle Park || || –
|- style="background: 
| 27 || April 29 || @ Padres* || – || || || — || Alfredo Harp Helú Stadium || || –
|- style="background: 
| 28 || April 30 || @ Padres* || – || || || — || Alfredo Harp Helú Stadium || || –
|-
|colspan="10"|*April 29 and 30 games played in Mexico City, Mexico
|- 
 

|- style="background: 
| 29 || May 1 || @ Astros || – || || || — || Minute Maid Park || || –
|- style="background: 
| 30 || May 2 || @ Astros || – || || || — || Minute Maid Park || || –
|- style="background: 
| 31 || May 3 || @ Astros || – || || || — || Minute Maid Park || || –
|- style="background: 
| 32 || May 5 || Brewers || – || || || — || Oracle Park || || –
|- style="background: 
| 33 || May 6 || Brewers || – || || || — || Oracle Park || || –
|- style="background: 
| 34 || May 7 || Brewers || – || || || — || Oracle Park || || –
|- style="background: 
| 35 || May 8 || Nationals || – || || || — || Oracle Park || || –
|- style="background: 
| 36 || May 9 || Nationals || – || || || — || Oracle Park || || –
|- style="background: 
| 37 || May 10 || Nationals || – || || || — || Oracle Park || || –
|- style="background: 
| 38 || May 11 || @ Diamondbacks || – || || || — || Chase Field || || –
|- style="background: 
| 39 || May 12 || @ Diamondbacks || – || || || — || Chase Field || || –
|- style="background: 
| 40 || May 13 || @ Diamondbacks || – || || || — || Chase Field || || –
|- style="background: 
| 41 || May 14 || @ Diamondbacks || – || || || — || Chase Field || || –
|- style="background: 
| 42 || May 15 || Phillies || – || || || — || Oracle Park || || –
|- style="background: 
| 43 || May 16 || Phillies || – || || || — || Oracle Park || || –
|- style="background: 
| 44 || May 17 || Phillies || – || || || — || Oracle Park || || –
|- style="background: 
| 45 || May 19 || Marlins || – || || || — || Oracle Park || || –
|- style="background: 
| 46 || May 20 || Marlins || – || || || — || Oracle Park || || –
|- style="background: 
| 47 || May 21 || Marlins || – || || || — || Oracle Park || || –
|- style="background: 
| 48 || May 22 || @ Twins || – || || || — || Target Field || || –
|- style="background: 
| 49 || May 23 || @ Twins || – || || || — || Target Field || || –
|- style="background: 
| 50 || May 24 || @ Twins || – || || || — || Target Field || || –
|- style="background: 
| 51 || May 25 || @ Brewers || – || || || — || American Family Field || || –
|- style="background: 
| 52 || May 26 || @ Brewers || – || || || — || American Family Field || || –
|- style="background: 
| 53 || May 27 || @ Brewers || – || || || — || American Family Field || || –
|- style="background: 
| 54 || May 28 || @ Brewers || – || || || — || American Family Field || || –
|- style="background: 
| 55 || May 29 || Pirates || – || || || — || Oracle Park || || –
|- style="background: 
| 56 || May 30 || Pirates || – || || || — || Oracle Park || || –
|- style="background: 
| 57 || May 31 || Pirates || – || || || — || Oracle Park || || –
|- 
 

|- style="background: 
| 58 || June 2 || Orioles || – || || || — || Oracle Park || || –
|- style="background: 
| 59 || June 3 || Orioles || – || || || — || Oracle Park || || –
|- style="background: 
| 60 || June 4 || Orioles || – || || || — || Oracle Park || || –
|- style="background: 
| 61 || June 6 || @ Rockies || – || || || — || Coors Field || || –
|- style="background: 
| 62 || June 7 || @ Rockies || – || || || — || Coors Field || || –
|- style="background: 
| 63 || June 8 || @ Rockies || – || || || — || Coors Field || || –
|- style="background: 
| 64 || June 9 || Cubs || – || || || — || Oracle Park || || –
|- style="background: 
| 65 || June 10 || Cubs || – || || || — || Oracle Park || || –
|- style="background: 
| 66 || June 11 || Cubs || – || || || — || Oracle Park || || –
|- style="background: 
| 67 || June 12 || @ Cardinals || – || || || — || Busch Stadium || || –
|- style="background: 
| 68 || June 13 || @ Cardinals || – || || || — || Busch Stadium || || –
|- style="background: 
| 69 || June 14 || @ Cardinals || – || || || — || Busch Stadium || || –
|- style="background: 
| 70 || June 16 || @ Dodgers || – || || || — || Dodger Stadium || || –
|- style="background: 
| 71 || June 17 || @ Dodgers || – || || || — || Dodger Stadium || || –
|- style="background: 
| 72 || June 18 || @ Dodgers || – || || || — || Dodger Stadium || || –
|- style="background: 
| 73 || June 19 || Padres || – || || || — || Oracle Park || || –
|- style="background: 
| 74 || June 20 || Padres || – || || || — || Oracle Park || || –
|- style="background: 
| 75 || June 21 || Padres || – || || || — || Oracle Park || || –
|- style="background: 
| 76 || June 22 || Padres || – || || || — || Oracle Park || || –
|- style="background: 
| 77 || June 23 || Diamondbacks || – || || || — || Oracle Park || || –
|- style="background: 
| 78 || June 24 || Diamondbacks || – || || || — || Oracle Park || || –
|- style="background: 
| 79 || June 25 || Diamondbacks || – || || || — || Oracle Park || || –
|- style="background: 
| 80 || June 27 || @ Blue Jays || – || || || — || Rogers Centre || || –
|- style="background: 
| 81 || June 28 || @ Blue Jays || – || || || — || Rogers Centre || || –
|- style="background: 
| 82 || June 29 || @ Blue Jays || – || || || — || Rogers Centre || || –
|- style="background: 
| 83 || June 30 || @ Mets || – || || || — || Citi Field || || –
|- 
 

|- style="background: 
| 84 || July 1 || @ Mets || – || || || — || Citi Field || || –
|- style="background: 
| 85 || July 2 || @ Mets || – || || || — || Citi Field || || –
|- style="background: 
| 86 || July 3 || Mariners || – || || || — || Oracle Park || || –
|- style="background: 
| 87 || July 4 || Mariners || – || || || — || Oracle Park || || –
|- style="background: 
| 88 || July 5 || Mariners || – || || || — || Oracle Park || || –
|- style="background: 
| 89 || July 7 || Rockies || – || || || — || Oracle Park || || –
|- style="background: 
| 90 || July 8 || Rockies || – || || || — || Oracle Park || || –
|- style="background: 
| 91 || July 9 || Rockies || – || || || — || Oracle Park || || –
|-style=background:#bbbfff
| – || July 11 || colspan="9"|93rd All-Star Game in Seattle, WA
|- style="background: 
| 92 || July 14 || @ Pirates || – || || || — || PNC Park || || –
|- style="background: 
| 93 || July 15 || @ Pirates || – || || || — || PNC Park || || –
|- style="background: 
| 94 || July 16 || @ Pirates || – || || || — || PNC Park || || –
|- style="background: 
| 95 || July 17 || @ Reds || – || || || — || Great American Ball Park || || –
|- style="background: 
| 96 || July 18 || @ Reds || – || || || — || Great American Ball Park || || –
|- style="background: 
| 97 || July 19 || @ Reds || – || || || — || Great American Ball Park || || –
|- style="background: 
| 98 || July 20 || @ Reds || – || || || — || Great American Ball Park || || –
|- style="background: 
| 99 || July 21 || @ Nationals || – || || || — || Nationals Park || || –
|- style="background: 
| 100 || July 22 || @ Nationals || – || || || — || Nationals Park || || –
|- style="background: 
| 101 || July 23 || @ Nationals || – || || || — || Nationals Park || || –
|- style="background: 
| 102 || July 25 || Athletics || – || || || — || Oracle Park || || –
|- style="background: 
| 103 || July 26 || Athletics || – || || || — || Oracle Park || || –
|- style="background: 
| 104 || July 28 || Red Sox || – || || || — || Oracle Park || || –
|- style="background: 
| 105 || July 29 || Red Sox || – || || || — || Oracle Park || || –
|- style="background: 
| 106 || July 30 || Red Sox || – || || || — || Oracle Park || || –
|- style="background: 
| 107 || July 31 || Diamondbacks || – || || || — || Oracle Park || || –
|- 
 

|- style="background: 
| 108 || August 1 || Diamondbacks || – || || || — || Oracle Park || || –
|- style="background: 
| 109 || August 2 || Diamondbacks || – || || || — || Oracle Park || || –
|- style="background: 
| 110 || August 3 || Diamondbacks || – || || || — || Oracle Park || || –
|- style="background: 
| 111 || August 5 || @ Athletics || – || || || — || Oakland Coliseum || || –
|- style="background: 
| 112 || August 6 || @ Athletics || – || || || — || Oakland Coliseum || || –
|- style="background: 
| 113 || August 7 || @ Angels || – || || || — || Angel Stadium || || –
|- style="background: 
| 114 || August 8 || @ Angels || – || || || — || Angel Stadium || || –
|- style="background: 
| 115 || August 9 || @ Angels || – || || || — || Angel Stadium || || –
|- style="background: 
| 116 || August 11 || Rangers || – || || || — || Oracle Park || || –
|- style="background: 
| 117 || August 12 || Rangers || – || || || — || Oracle Park || || –
|- style="background: 
| 118 || August 13 || Rangers || – || || || — || Oracle Park || || –
|- style="background: 
| 119 || August 14 || Rays || – || || || — || Oracle Park || || –
|- style="background: 
| 120 || August 15 || Rays || – || || || — || Oracle Park || || –
|- style="background: 
| 121 || August 16 || Rays || – || || || — || Oracle Park || || –
|- style="background: 
| 122 || August 18 || @ Braves || – || || || — || Truist Park || || –
|- style="background: 
| 123 || August 19 || @ Braves || – || || || — || Truist Park || || –
|- style="background: 
| 124 || August 20 || @ Braves || – || || || — || Truist Park || || –
|- style="background: 
| 125 || August 21 || @ Phillies || – || || || — || Citizens Bank Park || || –
|- style="background: 
| 126 || August 22 || @ Phillies || – || || || — || Citizens Bank Park || || –
|- style="background: 
| 127 || August 23 || @ Phillies || – || || || — || Citizens Bank Park || || –
|- style="background: 
| 128 || August 25 || Braves || – || || || — || Oracle Park || || –
|- style="background: 
| 129 || August 26 || Braves || – || || || — || Oracle Park || || –
|- style="background: 
| 130 || August 27 || Braves || – || || || — || Oracle Park || || –
|- style="background: 
| 131 || August 28 || Reds || – || || || — || Oracle Park || || –
|- style="background: 
| 132 || August 29 || Reds || – || || || — || Oracle Park || || –
|- style="background: 
| 133 || August 30 || Reds || – || || || — || Oracle Park || || –
|- style="background: 
| 134 || August 31 || @ Padres || – || || || — || Petco Park || || –
|- 
 

|- style="background: 
| 135 || September 1 || @ Padres || – || || || — || Petco Park || || –
|- style="background: 
| 136 || September 2 || @ Padres || – || || || — || Petco Park || || –
|- style="background: 
| 137 || September 3 || @ Padres || – || || || — || Petco Park || || –
|- style="background: 
| 138 || September 4 || @ Cubs || – || || || — || Wrigley Field || || –
|- style="background: 
| 139 || September 5 || @ Cubs || – || || || — || Wrigley Field || || –
|- style="background: 
| 140 || September 6 || @ Cubs || – || || || — || Wrigley Field || || –
|- style="background: 
| 141 || September 8 || Rockies || – || || || — || Oracle Park || || –
|- style="background: 
| 142 || September 9 || Rockies || – || || || — || Oracle Park || || –
|- style="background: 
| 143 || September 10 || Rockies || – || || || — || Oracle Park || || –
|- style="background: 
| 144 || September 11 || Guardians || – || || || — || Oracle Park || || –
|- style="background: 
| 145 || September 12 || Guardians || – || || || — || Oracle Park || || –
|- style="background: 
| 146 || September 13 || Guardians || – || || || — || Oracle Park || || –
|- style="background: 
| 147 || September 14 || @ Rockies || – || || || — || Coors Field || || –
|- style="background: 
| 148 || September 15 || @ Rockies || – || || || — || Coors Field || || –
|- style="background: 
| 149 || September 16 || @ Rockies || – || || || — || Coors Field || || –
|- style="background: 
| 150 || September 17 || @ Rockies || – || || || — || Coors Field || || –
|- style="background: 
| 151 || September 19 || @ Diamondbacks || – || || || — || Chase Field || || –
|- style="background: 
| 152 || September 20 || @ Diamondbacks || – || || || — || Chase Field || || –
|- style="background: 
| 153 || September 21 || @ Dodgers || – || || || — || Dodger Stadium || || –
|- style="background: 
| 154 || September 22 || @ Dodgers || – || || || — || Dodger Stadium || || –
|- style="background: 
| 155 || September 23 || @ Dodgers || – || || || — || Dodger Stadium || || –
|- style="background: 
| 156 || September 24 || @ Dodgers || – || || || — || Dodger Stadium || || –
|- style="background: 
| 157 || September 25 || Padres || – || || || — || Oracle Park || || –
|- style="background: 
| 158 || September 26 || Padres || – || || || — || Oracle Park || || –
|- style="background: 
| 159 || September 27 || Padres || – || || || — || Oracle Park || || –
|- style="background: 
| 160 || September 29 || Dodgers || – || || || — || Oracle Park || || –
|- style="background: 
| 161 || September 30 || Dodgers || – || || || — || Oracle Park || || –
|- style="background: 
| 162 || October 1 || Dodgers || – || || || — || Oracle Park || || –
|-

Season standings

National League West

National League Wild Card

Roster

Farm system

Source:

References

External links
San Francisco Giants 2023 Schedule at MLB.com
2023 San Francisco Giants season at Baseball Reference

San Francisco Giants
San Francisco Giants seasons
San Francisco Giants